José Luis Senobua García (born 16 September 1978), commonly known as Sena, is a Spanish-born Equatoguinean retired footballer who played as a midfielder, and is the current assistant manager of CD Oriente. He was a member of the Equatorial Guinea national team.

Club career
Born in Almería, Andalusia, Sena finished his formation in Los Molinos CF's youth setup, and made his senior debuts with UD Almería B, playing several seasons in the regional leagues. On 25 January 1997, aged only 18, he made his first team debut, starting in a 1–1 away draw against UD Las Palmas in the Segunda División.

Sena alternated between both reserve and main squads during his spell, only appearing regularly with the latter in the 2000–01 campaign, in Segunda División B. He subsequently resumed his career appearing mainly in the fourth level but also in the regional leagues, representing CD Roquetas, AD Mar Menor-San Javier, Mármol Macael CD, Pinatar CF, UD Villa de Santa Brígida, CD Zuera, CD Teruel, AD Comarca de Níjar and AD Adra, retiring with the latter in 2007.

International career
Sena was called to the Spanish U-18 national team, although he never got to make debut in an official match. As  his father is a Bubi from Malabo, in 2003, he was called up to the Equatorial Guinea national team, along with several other Spanish-born players of Equatoguinean descent.

He made his debut in a 0–1 loss against Morocco at the 2004 African Cup of Nations qualifiers on 6 July 2003. This was his only appearance in the national team.

Personal life
Sena's cousin Kike, is also a footballer. A forward, he too was groomed at Almería's youth system.

References

External links
 
 

1978 births
Living people
Footballers from Almería
Citizens of Equatorial Guinea through descent
Spanish sportspeople of Equatoguinean descent
Spanish people of Bubi descent
Equatoguinean sportspeople of Spanish descent
Spanish footballers
Equatoguinean footballers
Association football midfielders
Segunda División players
Segunda División B players
Tercera División players
UD Almería B players
UD Almería players
CD Roquetas footballers
CD Teruel footballers
Pinatar CF players
Equatorial Guinea international footballers